Belfast Confetti is a poem about the aftermath of a sectarian riot in Belfast by Northern Irish poet and translator Ciarán Carson. The poem won the Irish Times Irish Literature Prize for Poetry. The name of the poem derives from the nickname for the large shipbuilding rivets and other scrap metal that were used as missiles by Protestant shipyard workers during anti-Catholic riots in Belfast. It is also featured in AQA's GCSE Anthology book as it is studied as part of the GCSE Literature course.

References

External links

 Ciarán Carson on "Belfast Confetti"
 AQA Specification

Irish poems
20th-century poems
Works about The Troubles (Northern Ireland)